Countdown to Looking Glass is a Canadian made-for-television movie that premiered in the United States on HBO on October 14, 1984 and was also broadcast on CTV in Canada. The movie presents a fictional confrontation between the United States and the Soviet Union over the Strait of Hormuz, the gateway to the Persian Gulf. The narrative of the film details the events that lead up to the initial exchange of nuclear weapons, which was triggered by a banking crisis, from the perspective of an ongoing news broadcast.

Unlike similar productions such as the previous year's Special Bulletin and the later Without Warning, the producers of this film decided not to make the entire production a simulated newscast, but instead break up the news portions with dramatic narrative scenes involving characters played by Helen Shaver and Michael Murphy. The appearance of real-life newscasters, as well as noted CBC Television host Patrick Watson (although he does not appear as himself in this film) lent additional authenticity to the production.

Plot
The CVN news network's nightly program, starring Don Tobin (Watson), with reports from correspondents Michael Boyle (Glenn) and Dorian Waldorf (Shaver), discusses a terrorist bombing of the American embassy in Saudi Arabia that killed the American ambassador. The week before, a global banking crisis, caused by several South American countries defaulting on their loans, led to turmoil in Southwest Asia. Before the unrest spread to Saudi Arabia, Soviet-backed militants led a coup in Oman when the Omani economy collapsed. Shortly after, a new report shows the banking crisis may soon begin to ease.

During this time, Waldorf's Pentagon insider boyfriend is providing off-the-record insight into the White House's response to all these events, and suggests that there may be too many critical events going on at once for the President and his advisers to handle effectively.

The following day, it is revealed that a large military operation was launched to keep the peace in Saudi Arabia, with many American soldiers, ships, and planes being sent at King Fahd's request. This move is heavily criticized - in the US and abroad. The United Kingdom, America's closest ally, refuses to take part in the operation as do many other of America's allies. However, the attitude of the American representatives is clear that they can perform the peacekeeping mission alone, citing the success of the British in the past in containing the Soviets' previous provocation in the area.

In response to this move, which the Soviet Union sees as provocative, the Soviet-backed puppet government in Oman imposes a $10,000 toll for every oil tanker passing through the Strait of Hormuz into the Persian Gulf. The Soviet government claims it will remove the toll if the Americans withdraw troops from Saudi Arabia. The captains of the tankers refuse to pay the toll, effectively creating an economic blockade in which no oil can be transported through the Persian Gulf.

A breaking news alert on the fifth day of the Middle East crisis reveals that a short battle took place between American warplanes and unidentified enemy warplanes, presumed to be from Iran or Kuwait, in which an American reconnaissance plane was shot down over the Persian Gulf before two of the five attacking planes were shot down. The attacking aircraft were presumably aiming for an oil refinery in Ras Tanura in retaliation for Saudi Arabia's request for American troops.

Meanwhile, Waldorf brings a story to CVN: her boyfriend had provided her with satellite photos that suggests that Soviet forces have disappeared from their border with the Middle East, possibly as a covert invitation to mutually withdraw from the area — an invitation that could have been ignored in the flood of information the multiple global crises have created ("The signal-to-noise ratio in there [The White House] is horrendous."). However, Tobin reluctantly insists that Waldorf have more than one source for the story.

The Soviet Union quickly responds to this action by sending submarines to the Persian Gulf. CVN sends Michael Boyle to the Nimitz to cover the deployment. The Soviets publicly criticize the United States for failing to accept their offers of conciliation and mutual withdrawal from the area, implying that Waldorf's information was correct and that the US may have given up an opportunity for a peaceful solution.

On day eight of the crisis, in response to the growing urgency of the situation, CVN begins to broadcast 24 hours a day. Shortly after a State Department briefing, the Defense Secretary dies, perhaps of a heart attack brought on by the stresses of crisis management.

On day nine, the crisis deepens when an Omani gunboat attacks and apparently destroys an unarmed Dutch vessel which tried to go through the Strait of Hormuz. The CVN broadcast also notes the presence of Soviet attack submarines near the site of the attack. At this point, people begin to evacuate cities, overseas air travel is suspended by the FAA and Civil Aeronautics Board, many American schools begin closing, the Strategic Air Command redeploys B-52 bombers throughout the nation's airports, and people are urged to stay off their phones. By nightfall, an evacuation of the White House is ordered, and the US begins shutting down its nuclear power plants nationwide, an act noted not to have happened since the Cuban Missile Crisis. Later, Waldorf is met by her boyfriend at the news studio, offering to take her along in the evacuation—the President has delegated tactical nuclear launch authority to the Nimitz battle group commander after the destruction of the Dutch vessel, and the chances of a nuclear exchange in the Gulf have increased significantly. Waldorf chooses to remain in Washington to continue her work.

A night battle then erupts between Omani gunboats and the U.S. Navy in the Strait of Hormuz, with an Omani gunboat firing on and disabling a warship before being destroyed by the other American vessels. Despite the gravity of the situation, Tobin discusses his optimistic viewpoint of the situation with correspondent Eric Sevareid, believing that "[r]easonable people, once they've looked the Devil in the face, aren't going to shake hands with him."

Shortly after the Omani gunboat exchanges fire with the American ship, a Soviet submarine slips through the perimeter of American picket ships and is tracked on a course towards the Nimitz, which attempts to defend itself by deploying depth charges in an effort to sink the sub. When these fail to stop the submarine, a large explosion erupts from the water, suggesting that a nuclear depth bomb was used to destroy it. Boyle evacuates into the carrier's island, confronting an officer to find out who provided authorization for the nuclear attack, but cannot get a clear answer. Shortly thereafter, a nuclear weapon detonates inside the battle group, causing an unknown level of damage, though the Nimitz remains afloat. Shortly thereafter, Boyle and the Nimitz lose contact with CVN, as high levels of atmospheric radiation interfere with the broadcast.

At this point, the White House is completely evacuated, with the President, Joint Chiefs of Staff, and other White House officials evacuated onto the National Emergency Airborne Command Post plane with the Strategic Air Command's airborne command center Looking Glass in accompaniment, and the Emergency Broadcast System is activated.

In the moments before CVN's broadcast is transferred over to the Emergency Broadcast System, Tobin reiterates his optimism, discussing the opinions of a deceased colleague who was considered an expert in nuclear war scenarios. His colleague held the belief that a nuclear exchange would someday take place, but when the two superpowers were confronted with the horror of the situation, they would choose peace over war. As a now-bewildered Tobin prepares to turn things over to the EBS, it is obvious that he is shaken by the events that have occurred, and is almost mournfully fearful over the inescapable realization that there may very well be no future at all for the Earth or humankind.

Cast

Notes

External links

Countdown to Looking Glass at YouTube

1984 television films
1984 films
1980s disaster films
Canadian disaster films
English-language Canadian films
Canadian drama television films
Disaster television films
Canadian docufiction films
Films about nuclear war and weapons
Films about World War III
Films set in Washington, D.C.
Films directed by Fred Barzyk
1980s Canadian films